Chase Mishkin (January 22, 1937 – July 24, 2022), born Mary Margaret Hahn, was an American theater producer. She was the winner of two Tony Awards, one for Dame Edna: The Royal Tour and the other for Memphis.

She was married to Ralph Mishkin from 1970 until his death in 1993, after which she produced her first play: Trish Vradenburg’s The Apple Doesn’t Fall… It opened in Los Angeles and moved to Broadway in 1996. In total she produced 30 Broadway shows over two decades, and as of 2009 had produced another 10 Off-Broadway.

References

External links 

1930s births
2022 deaths
20th-century American women
21st-century American women
Tony Award winners
American theatre managers and producers